Pavel Zaduban (born 1 October 1968) is a Slovak cyclist. He competed in the men's individual road race at the 1996 Summer Olympics.

References

External links
 

1968 births
Living people
Slovak male cyclists
Olympic cyclists of Slovakia
Cyclists at the 1996 Summer Olympics
Sportspeople from Považská Bystrica